Dorcaschema alternatum is a species of beetle in the family Cerambycidae. It was described by Say in 1824, originally under the genus Saperda. It is known from the United States. It feeds off of Morus celtidifolia.

References

Dorcaschematini
Beetles described in 1824